Wojciech Bursa (23 April 1895 – 1940) was a Polish sports shooter. He competed in the 25 m pistol event at the 1936 Summer Olympics. He was killed during the Katyn massacre, in the month of his 45th birthday in April 1940.

References

1895 births
1940 deaths
Polish male sport shooters
Olympic shooters of Poland
Shooters at the 1936 Summer Olympics
Place of birth missing
Katyn massacre victims
Male murder victims
Polish military personnel killed in World War II